Tambajang Forest Park is a Forest Park in the Gambia. Established on January 1, 1954, it covers 752 hectares. 

It occupies a position in the Low River region at an altitude of 33 meters.

References

Protected areas established in 1954
Forest parks of the Gambia
1954 establishments in Africa